Cecilia Camellini (born 10 March 1992 in Modena) is a visually-impaired, born blind, Paralympic swimmer of Italy. At the 2008 Summer Paralympics she won two silver medals. At the 2012 Summer Paralympics she won two gold in world record time, and two bronze medals.

Camellini is an athlete of the Gruppo Sportivo Fiamme Oro.

Biography
Blind since birth, started swimming at the age of three years.

World records
 100m Freestyle S11: 1:07.29 ( London, 31 August 2012)
 100m Backstroke S11: 1:19.64 ( Berlin, 28 June 2012)

Others achievements

See also
List of IPC world records in swimming – Women's long course
Swimming at the 2012 Summer Paralympics

References

External links
 

1992 births
Living people
Sportspeople from Modena
Paralympic swimmers of Italy
Swimmers at the 2008 Summer Paralympics
Swimmers at the 2012 Summer Paralympics
Paralympic gold medalists for Italy
Paralympic silver medalists for Italy
Paralympic bronze medalists for Italy
World record holders in paralympic swimming
Medalists at the 2008 Summer Paralympics
Medalists at the 2012 Summer Paralympics
S11-classified Paralympic swimmers
Swimmers of Fiamme Oro
Medalists at the World Para Swimming European Championships
Paralympic medalists in swimming
Italian female freestyle swimmers
Italian female backstroke swimmers